The Kirner Ministry was the 63rd ministry of the Government of Victoria. It was led by the Premier of Victoria, Joan Kirner, of the Labor Party. The ministry was sworn in on 10 August 1990.

Ministry

References

Victoria (Australia) ministries
Australian Labor Party ministries in Victoria (Australia)
1990 establishments in Australia
1992 disestablishments in Australia
Ministries of Elizabeth II
Cabinets established in 1990
Cabinets disestablished in 1992